Leslie Township may refer to the following places in the United States:

 Leslie Township, Michigan
 Leslie Township, Todd County, Minnesota
 Leslie Township, Carroll County, Missouri

Township name disambiguation pages